The Women's World Team Chess Championship 2009 was played in the Chinese city Ningbo.

Teams 

China "One"
 Hou Yifan
 Zhao Xue
 Shen Yang
 Ju Wenjun
 Huang Qian

Georgia
 Maia Chiburdanidze
 Nana Dzagnidze
 Lela Javakhishvili
 Maia Lomineishvili
 Sopiko Khukhashvili

Russia
 Tatiana Kosintseva
 Nadezhda Kosintseva
 Ekaterina Kovalevskaya
 Marina Romanko
 Valentina Gunina

Ukraina
 Anna Ushenina
 Natalia Zhukova
 Inna Yanovska
 Mariya Muzychuk
 Natalia Zdebskaya

India
 Harika Dronavalli
 Tania Sachdev
 Kruttika Nadig
 Eesha Karavade
 Mary Ann Gomes

Poland
 Iweta Rajlich
 Jolanta Zawadzka
 Joanna Majdan
 Joanna Dworakowska
 Karina Szczepkowska-Horowska

USA
 Irina Krush
 Anna Zatonskih
 Rusudan Goletiani
 Alisa Melekhina
 Tatev Abrahamian

Armenia
 Elina Danielian
 Lilit Mkrtchian
 Lilit Galojan
 Nelly Aginian
 Siranush Andriasian

China "Two"
 Tan Zhongyi
 Zhang Xiaowen
 Wang Yu
 Ding Yixin
 Wang Xiaohui

Vietnam
 Hoàng Thị Bảo Trâm
 Phạm Lê Thảo Nguyên
 Hoàng Thị Như Ý
 Phạm Bích Ngọc
 Võ Thị Kim Phụng

Results

 China One
 Russia
 Ukraine
 Georgia
 Armenia
 Poland
 India
 USA
 China Two
 Vietnam

References

Team
Chess in China
2009 in chess
2009 in Chinese sport